For serial killers see: List of serial killers by number of victims
For mass murderers and spree killers see: List of rampage killers
For dictators see: List of dictators by death toll

See also 

 Lists of murderers